KTZT may refer to:

 KTZT-CD, a television station (channel 29) licensed to serve Tulsa, Oklahoma, United States
 Belle Plaine Municipal Airport in Belle Plaine, Iowa (ICAO code KTZT)